Delix Therapeutics is an American biotech company based in Boston, Massachusetts. The company develops novel neuroplasticity-promoting therapeutics for central nervous system (CNS) diseases such as depression and post-traumatic stress disorder (PTSD). It was co-founded in 2019 by David E. Olson and Nick Haft.

Company History 
The company was founded to develop novel psychoplastogens to better treat mental health disorders at scale. David E. Olson founded the company following his discovery that psychedelics are highly potent neuroplasticity-promoting compounds. In September 2021, Delix secured a Series A financing round to continue their work focused on psychoplastogens and neuroplasticity therapeutics. Also in Fall of 2021, Delix joined the National Institute on Drug Abuse industry partnering program to screen psychoplastogens in models of substance use disorder. In 2021, the company expanded the leadership team, adding a new CEO, CSO, and CMO

Product Candidates 
To date, the company has synthesized over 1000 novel psychoplastogens. Many of these small molecule compounds are analogs of known psychedelics such as ibogaine and 5-MeO-DMT. Delix focuses on the development of non-hallucinogenic psychoplastogens as scalable alternatives to first-generation hallucinogenic psychoplastogens like ketamine and psilocybin. Their compounds have been engineered to lack cardiotoxicity and psychostimulant properties characteristic of other first-generation psychoplastogens. Two of the company’s known compounds are tabernanthalog and AAZ-A-154. Delix has licensed these compounds from UC Davis.

See also 

 Psychoplastogen
 Tabernanthalog
 AAZ-A-154
 David E. Olson

References 

Biopharmaceutical companies
Pharmaceutical companies of the United States
Biotechnology companies established in the 21st century
Biotechnology companies of the United States
Companies based in Boston
American companies established in 2019
2019 establishments in Massachusetts